Niceforonia brunnea, the Carchi Andes frog, is a species of frog in the family Strabomantidae found in Colombia and Ecuador. Its natural habitat is subtropical or tropical high-altitude grassland. It is threatened by habitat loss.

References

brunnea
Amphibians of the Andes
Amphibians of Colombia
Amphibians of Ecuador
Amphibians described in 1975
Taxonomy articles created by Polbot